Coprobacter fastidiosus is a Gram-negative, obligately anaerobic, rod-shaped, non-spore-forming and non-motil bacterium from the genus of Coprobacter which has been isolated from the faeces of an infant in Russia.

References

External links
Type strain of Coprobacter fastidiosus at BacDive -  the Bacterial Diversity Metadatabase

Bacteroidia
Bacteria described in 2013